Universal Resort station is a subway station on  and the  of the Beijing Subway. It is located near the entrance of Universal Beijing Resort. The station opened on 26 August 2021.

Station Layout 
Both the line 7 and Batong line stations have underground island platforms.

See also
Universal Beijing Resort

References

Beijing Subway stations in Tongzhou District
Railway stations in China opened in 2021